German submarine U-567 was a type VII C submarine in Nazi Germany's Kriegsmarine during the Second World War.

Her keel was laid down on 27 April 1940 at the Blohm & Voss yard in Hamburg as yard number 543. She was launched on 6 March 1941 and was commissioned  on 24 April under Kapitänleutnant Theodor Fahr. She entered service with the 3rd U-boat Flotilla for training. She began operations with that flotilla on 1 August 1941 and joined the 7th Flotilla on 1 November.

The U-boat was sunk with the loss of all crew on 21 December 1941.

Design
German Type VIIC submarines were preceded by the shorter Type VIIB submarines. U-567 had a displacement of  when at the surface and  while submerged. She had two shafts and two  propellers.

U-567 was fitted with five  torpedo tubes (four fitted at the bow and one at the stern), fourteen torpedoes, one  SK C/35 naval gun, 220 rounds, and a  C/30 anti-aircraft gun. The boat had a complement of between forty-four and sixty.

Service history

First patrol
She left Trondheim in Norway on 5 August 1941 and entered the Atlantic via the gap between Iceland and the Faroe Islands, sinking the 3,485 GRT British merchant ship Fort Richepanse west of Ireland on 3 September. She docked at St. Nazaire in occupied France on 12 September.

Second patrol
The boat switched captains to Kapitänleutnant Engelbert Endrass, (who had been IWO [first watch officer] on Günther Prien's  when she sank the battleship  in 1939), on 15 October. The boat left St. Nazaire on 25 October 1941 and returned on 26 November. The patrol was unsuccessful.

Third patrol and loss
She attacked convoy HG 76 in the North Atlantic, north-east of the Azores, which was made up of 32 cargo ships and escorted by five destroyers, seven corvettes and one aircraft carrier, sinking the 3,324 GRT Norwegian merchant ship Annavore on 21 December 1941.

Wolfpacks
U-567 took part in five wolfpacks, namely:
 Grönland (10 – 23 August 1941) 
 Kurfürst (23 August – 2 September 1941) 
 Seewolf (2 – 9 September 1941) 
 Stosstrupp (30 October – 4 November 1941) 
 Störtebecker (15 – 24 November 1941)

Summary of raiding history

Sources

Bibliography

External links

German Type VIIC submarines
1941 ships
U-boats sunk in 1941
U-boats sunk by British warships
U-boats sunk by depth charges
Ships built in Hamburg
Ships lost with all hands
World War II submarines of Germany
World War II shipwrecks in the Atlantic Ocean
U-boats commissioned in 1941
Maritime incidents in December 1941